La Loma is a town and municipality within the Figueroa Department of Santiago del Estero Province in northwestern Argentina.

See also
La Loma, Catamarca

References

Populated places in Santiago del Estero Province